The fixture list for the 2021 season was issued on 14 February 2021. The regular season comprised 18 rounds.

The end-of-season play-offs featured the clubs finishing second to sixth in the regular season in a four round elimination competition to decide which team accompanied the team finishing first into the Championship for 2022.

Four matches were postponed due under the RFL COVID-19 protocols and were not rearranged.

All times are UK local time (UTC+1) on the relevant dates.

Regular season

Round 1

Round 2

Round 3

Round 4

Round 5

Round 6

Round 7

Round 8

Round 9

Round 10

Round 11

Round 12

Round 13

Round 14

Round 15

Round 16

Round 17

Round 18

Play-offs
Workington Town, who finished the regular season in second place, advanced straight to the qualifying semi-final in the second week of the play-offs. Teams that finished 3rd to 6th after the regular season played off in qualifying and elimination play-offs respectively. Keighley Cougars defeated North Wales Crusaders in the qualifying play-off and proceeded to the qualifying play-off against Workington Town, where they lost. Doncaster defeated Hunslet in the elimination play-off which resulted in the latter being eliminated from the play-offs. Doncaster then proceeded to defeat North Wales in the elimination semi-final which saw them advance to the preliminary final against Keighley.

Team bracket

Week 1: Elimination and qualifying play-offs

Week 2: Semi-finals

Week 3: Preliminary final

Week 4: Promotion play-off final

References

RFL League 1
2021 in English rugby league
2021 in Welsh rugby league